Endurance is an American reality television series, previously shown on the Discovery Kids cable network in the United States and also on networks in other countries. The show's format is somewhat similar to the television series Survivor, with a teenage cast. Endurance contestants live in a remote location and participate in various mental and physical challenges, although Endurance contestants compete as pairs (one boy and one girl), and the outcome of the competitions determines which pair of players is eliminated.

In its six-year run between 2002 through 2008, each season began with a new slate of contestants, who were gradually eliminated as the season progressed until the remaining two teams competed to get all of the Endurance Pyramid pieces. The winning boy and girl received an all-expenses paid vacation package with their parents to an exotic location as the prize.

Production ended with the final episode of the sixth season, first aired on June 28, 2008. After the series ended, reruns continued to air on Hub Network until July 21, 2013. The first four seasons of the show also aired on NBC on Saturday mornings under the Discovery Kids on NBC umbrella from 2002 to 2006. Three seasons of Endurance (Hawaii, Tehachapi and High Sierras) were each nominated for a Daytime Emmy Award in the category of "Outstanding Children's Series", however the show never won.

Production
The show was produced by 3Ball Productions. Its co-creator, former actor and children's game show presenter, J. D. Roth, is the executive producer and on-screen host. Roth received a Daytime Emmy nomination in 2006 as "Outstanding Performer in a Children's Series" for Endurance: Tehachapi but did not win.

Contestants ages 12–15 were chosen each spring from five-minute audition tapes sent in by more than 12,000 teens to the show's production team. Twenty players were selected to participate in each of the first five seasons of Endurance; this was reduced to sixteen in Season 6. In a 2004 newspaper interview, Roth revealed that he looked for as diverse a group as possible. Shooting of the series took place each summer over a three-week period and began with the selected teenaged contestants arriving at a secret remote location in late July. Each season was taped in a different location, including California, Hawaii, Mexico, and Fiji.

In a January, 2007, interview with the Boston Globe, Connor Finnegan recalled his experience as an Endurance: High Sierras player the previous summer: "At first it was weird being filmed all the time. You'd be talking and suddenly there would be a camera or microphone shoved into your face. The big rule with reality TV is never to look at the camera."

As part of the show, host J. D. Roth and the players sometimes discuss the interpersonal drama occurring among the teams. Roth has said that many participants have become close friends while the series was being shot, learning tolerance for people who were different from themselves. However, the Boston Globe reported that there was friction among the players on Endurance: High Sierras following the controversial break-up of teams. Finnegan's mother said, "There was definitely some nastiness", complaining that the producers and writers, "deliberately put the kids in situations that are designed to increase the drama and tension". But, Taylor Sico-McNulty, another Endurance: High Sierras contestant from Massachusetts and Finnegan's partner, said that when she returned home following the show's California taping, she "really missed seeing all the other kids in the cast every day", adding that a number of player reunions have since been held.

Another player from the fifth season, Dakota Fisher of Eliot, Maine, echoed the feeling, saying that his appearance on Endurance left him with relationships he will never forget. "You should have seen me a week after the show, it was depressing", said the 15-year-old who had been trying for two years to get on the Emmy-nominated teen reality program.
 
Roth said in a 2007 news release, "Being on Endurance is a life-altering experience for every kid who is selected. With only the sun, moon, stars and each other, these kids have no choice but to get to really know each other. They learn to dig deep within themselves when someone says they can’t do something. They learn to overcome first impressions and prejudice and they build tremendous self-confidence by tapping into skills they never even knew they had."

Endurance is the successor to Moolah Beach, a show created by Roth which was not renewed after its single 2001 season, when a change in ownership of Fox Family Channel opened up a new offer from Discovery Kids for a reality series. From 2002 until 2006, Endurance was also broadcast on the NBC network as part of its Saturday morning Discovery Kids on NBC block of programs.

Locations

The contests

The Right To Stay Challenge
Shortly after they arrive, the group of 20 contestants competes in the first Endurance game, called the Right To Stay Challenge. As the name implies, this game eliminates a group of contestants from continuing any further in the game. The game is normally a test of endurance, where each contestant has to hold on to something such as a bar or a pole for as long as possible. In Seasons 1 through 4, the first three girls and the first three boys to let go were eliminated. In Season 5, the game was a test of balance and speed, and the last two boys and last two girls to finish the game were eliminated. In Season 6, the first two boys and two girls to let go of a rope were eliminated, winnowing the sixteen hopefuls to twelve contestants who earned the right to stay, forming six teams of players.

In Season 3, the eliminated players were brought back the following day to compete in a second chance Right to Stay game. The winner of this game (Tom) chose his partner from the group of girls (Vanetta), forming the Brown team.

In Seasons 3 and 5 the group was required to choose two players (a boy and a girl) who were allowed to sit out the Right To Stay Challenge, automatically advancing as if they had survived the challenge. In season 3 the boys were required to choose one girl to be safe and the girls were required to save a boy, the boys saved Lindi and the girls chose Reece because they were the most attractive in their opinions. In season 5, Darci and Aric were selected to sit out. They were then each allowed to save one other person (of the same gender). Darci chose Kelsey, Aric chose Alex.

Choosing teams
The day after the Right To Stay Challenge, the remaining players compete in another game to determine teams. Each team consists of one boy and one girl. The game and the rules vary from year to year. The team colors are red, orange, yellow, green, blue, purple and gray (brown is added in seasons with 8 teams and is removed in seasons with 7 teams). In season 6, there is no gray team.

After the teams are decided, they each receive one pyramid piece of the Endurance Pyramid. To win the game and the grand prize trip, one team must possess all of the pieces. (10 pieces in the first season, 12 in Seasons 2 and 3, 13 in Seasons 4 and 5, and 14 in Season 6).

Endurance Mission
With the teams now assigned, they begin competing in Endurance Missions. This is usually a test of skill. The team that wins the Endurance Mission wins a Samadhi that contains something that will have a negative effect on one team during the Temple Mission that the winning team gets to give to any team to play with its effect. The winners of the Endurance Mission also receive a pyramid piece. However, it is customary, that when three teams remain, the winners of the Samadhi have the right to not give its effect to a team, leaving a level playing field for the final Temple Mission.

Samadhi
The teams compete for a Samadhi fairly often through the entire game. All of them but two had a negative impact on another team. In Season 3 (Endurance Hawaii) there was a Samadhi that benefitted the team that it was given to. Chris and Lindi (the Gray Team) won that Samadhi, and decided to keep it. It gave them the option to switch teams or to take all the pieces from one team, which they did to the Yellow Team. In Season 5, the Blue team won the power to switch two teams around. In Season 1 the team that won the Samadhi at the Final 3 stage chose to eliminate it from the game. In Season 2, the team that won the Samadhi at the Final 4 stage chose to eliminate it from the game as well. This pattern was broken in Season 3, however. Also, in Season 5, the first Samadhi (won in the mission "Hot Potato") was the ability to make two players switch teams or give another team the power to make the switch. Taylor and Isaac, the original Blue team, won this Samadhi. They gave it to the Red team, who used it to switch Connor onto the Blue team and Isaac onto the Gray team. The first time the Samadhi was introduced, J.D. explained that the word Samadhi is the Buddhist word for "contemplation."

Temple mission
This mission is usually one of endurance (hence the show's title). The team that wins a Temple Mission usually earns the right to choose two other teams to send to the "Temple of Fate", the elimination challenge.

Temple of Fate
The two teams sent to the Temple of Fate bring with them all pyramid pieces they have won up to that point. In a variant of the Rock, Paper, Scissors intransitive game, the teams select water, wood, or fire to defeat one another in a best 2 out of 3 match, e.g.,

 Water puts out Fire (Water wins)
 Wood floats on Water (Wood wins)
 Fire burns Wood (Fire wins)

The first team to win two rounds wins the challenge and the right to stay in the game. The losers are immediately eliminated. In Season 1, the losing team's pieces went to the team winning the next episode's challenge; in all subsequent seasons, the losing team gave their pyramid pieces to any team of their choice, with a farewell note read to the remaining contestants.

Pyramid pieces
The pyramid pieces play an important part in the game, since one team must possess all of the pieces to win the game. Season 1 had 10, Seasons 2 and 3 had 12, Seasons 4 and 5 had 13, and Season 6 has 14.

Golden Triangle of Immunity
In Season 5, the Golden Triangle of Immunity was added. It is a border that is placed around the Friendship piece. It may be transferred to another team with any temple mission. In Season 5 the Triangle of Immunity was given to the Purple Team of: Dakota Fisher and Kelsey Schultz, by Anna and Garret. The team in possession of the Triangle of Immunity can avoid being sent to temple once, but is only able to use it until the final four. Once they reach the final three, the Triangle of Immunity is removed from the game. Season 6 removed the Triangle of Immunity, as the Friendship piece is back to a regular pyramid piece.

Magic Box
In Season 6, a new aspect of Endurance called the Magic Box was introduced. This is a challenge where teams compete for the chance to gain an advantage over the other teams. Leslie Powell and Will Cuddy (the Green team) won the first Magic Box in the episode "Mana Kisi". Inside, the Magic Box contained one free round at the Temple of Fate, to be used before the Temple of Fate challenge begins. In addition to winning a Magic Box, teams are allowed to do what they want with the information given. They decided to lie about it. In the end when the Green Team was sent up to temple with their friends the Orange Team, they used their advantage against them and sent the Orange Team home.

The Final Challenge

For the Final Challenge, both teams go to the Temple of Fate with all the pieces they have won. These pieces are now used as chips to play a shell game type challenge.

The team with fewer pieces starts by placing pieces by a group of pyramids, one of which has the gold pyramid under it. That team may claim as many as it wishes but must leave at least one pyramid unclaimed. The team with more pieces must claim the pyramids that its opponent did not claim. At this point, the gold pyramid is revealed, and the team that has claimed it wins all the pieces that were played on the board. If teams have the same number of pieces the team that had fewer pieces the round before places first. If teams are tied in first round, the team that won the final mission places their pieces first

There are three pyramids to start the game, and one more is added every round thereafter.
The team that gets all the pyramid pieces wins the challenge, the game and the grand prize trip.

Season summaries

Season 1 - Endurance (2002–03)
The premiere season was taped in the summer of 2002 on Parsons Beach on Catalina Island, California. Each of the seven teams played for one of seven grand prize trips.

The Blue team of Aaron Thornburg and Jonna Mannion won their grand prize trip, which was a trip to the Amazon*.

Mannion was also a participant on the show The Real World: Cancun and its spin-off show The Challenge on MTV. She was also on the TruTv series Rehab: Party at the Hard Rock Hotel as a cocktail waitress. She was also featured in the LMFAO music video for "La La La".

Skyler Russell was featured on A&E's Intervention  (season 12, episode 8) in which he is battling an addiction to bath salts in an attempt to distance himself from his stage mother who pushed him into show business. He died on October 16, 2020, after suffering from a brain infection and organ failure caused by alcohol withdrawal.

The season consisted of seven teams (in order of elimination):

Elimination table

Key
 (FIRST) The team won the Final Temple Mission and became “Endurance” Champions.
 (SECOND) The team lost the Final Temple Mission and were the runners-up.
 (WIN) The team won the Endurance Mission, the previously eliminated team's pyramid pieces, and the Samadhi.
 (WIN) The team won the Temple Mission.
 (SAMADHI) The team was handicapped with the Samadhi by the winning team.
 (SAFE) The team did not win the challenge, but was safe from going to Temple or did not receive the Samadhi.
 (TEMPLE) The team won at the Temple of Fate and avoided elimination.
 (OUT) The team lost at the Temple of Fate and was eliminated.

Notes
1In "Tilt", the winning team, in this case the Blue team, won the two remaining pyramid pieces that were not in play after the "Fate Falls" challenge.
2 The Yellow team would have received the Samadhi, but the Blue team decided to take it out of the game.
3In “Don't Drop the Ball”, the only prize up for grabs was the pyramid piece left behind by the Red team.

Challenges
Tilt
Knotted Up
Plant the Flag
Squeeze Play
Water Logged
Eruption
House of Cards
Dial In
Build a Pyramid
Leap of Fate
Don't Drop the Ball
Final Temple

Season 2 - Endurance 2 (2003–04)
Endurance 2 was taped in Baja California, near the resort town of La Paz, Mexico. An unusual twist in this season was the return of Jenna and Max, who were previously eliminated in season one, chosen to become the Brown Team from an alumni vote of Season 1 contestants who reunited at a reunion. One contestant, 14-year-old Tyler Burkhalter, competed despite having diabetes requiring daily insulin treatments.

In the end, Max DeLeo and Jenna Jimenez won the game, earning the grand prize trip to Atlantis Paradise Island in the Bahamas.

This season consisted of eight teams (in order of elimination):

Their eliminations did not affect the arrival of Max and Jenna as the Brown team, who arrived after the formation of the seven official teams.

Elimination table

Key
 (FIRST) The team won the Final Temple Mission and became “Endurance” Champions.
 (SECOND) The team lost the Final Temple Mission and were the runners-up.
 (WIN) The team won the Endurance Mission and the Samadhi.
 (WIN) The team won the Temple Mission.
 (SAMADHI) The team was handicapped with the Samadhi by the winning team.
 (SAFE) The team did not win the challenge, but was safe from going to Temple or did not receive the Samadhi.
 (TEMPLE) The team won at the Temple of Fate and avoided elimination.
 (OUT) The team lost at the Temple of Fate and was eliminated.

Notes
1 The Green team would have received the Samadhi, but the Orange team decided to take it out of the game.
2 In the final challenge, the Brown and Green teams competed for the eight pieces left behind by the Orange team. Each team won four pieces.

Challenges
Tower of Power
Fireball
Rollerball
Tide Pull
On the Ropes
Face to Face
Cherry Picker
Aqueduct
Plank Maze
Pathfinder
Final Mission
Final Temple

Season 3 - Endurance 3: Hawaii (2004–05)
Moving to Wainiha Valley, Kauai, Hawaii, for the third season, a number of production problems were encountered, including difficulties in obtaining location permits, torrential rains, muddy conditions, and mosquitoes. It had 21 episodes including casting specials showing the selection process. One of the contestants, Rachel Lofton of the Red team, is the daughter of Pro Football Hall of Famer and San Diego Chargers coach James Lofton. There were many twists including bringing back six eliminated players, after the right to stay, to compete in a challenge to become an official endurance player. The winner would choose someone from the opposite sex and they would become the Brown Team. Tom won and chose Vanetta as his partner. Later, Vanetta injured her knee: while walking outside of her hut and stepping down, she cut her leg on a piece of bamboo. The cut required more than 20 stitches, and she was removed from the game, making Tom the first person in Endurance to be a one-person team. Also, he was the first person to go to the Temple of Fate without a partner.

In the end, the Gray team of Chris Vanderwier and Lindi Oest won, with a trip to the Galápagos Islands as their prize.

This was the only season to see the Gray team continue on past the first temple elimination. There was also a special program at the conclusion of the season showing winners Chris Vanderweir and Lindi Oest enjoying their trip to the Galápagos Islands.

After the season, Vanetta Smith of the Brown team starred in the movie Freedom Writers.

Kareem Nugent was on BET during the BET Split Ya Game contest as his named was Karma .

Demian Martinez was a contestant on The N's reality show Girls v. Boys Puerto Rico and also appeared during one episode of Scare Tactics after being set up by his mom.

In 2012, Tom Maden played Rigo in season 3 of the ABC Family show Make It or Break It and starred as Jake Fitzgerald in the MTV series Scream.

In November 2015, Alex Reid joined BP RaNia, a South Korean girl group.

The eight teams competing were (in order of elimination):

Elimination table

Key
 (FIRST) The team won the Final Temple Mission and became “Endurance” Champions.
 (SECOND) The team lost the Final Temple Mission and were the runners-up.
 (WIN) The team won the Endurance Mission, the previously eliminated team's pyramid pieces, and the Samadhi.
 (WIN) The team won the Temple Mission.
 (SAMADHI) The team was handicapped with the Samadhi by the winning team.
 (SAFE) The team did not win the challenge, but was safe from going to Temple or did not receive the Samadhi.
 (TEMPLE) The team won at the Temple of Fate and avoided elimination.
 (OUT) The team lost at the Temple of Fate and was eliminated.
 (OUT) This team/person was removed from the game due to injury before they were sent to temple.

Notes
1 In "Out on a Limb" there was no Samadhi to give to another team, nor did the winning team win a pyramid piece. The winning team (Yellow) got the chance to create two super-teams. The Yellow team created their super-team of Yellow, Grey, and Purple. The second super-team was Orange, Brown, and Red. The winning super-team members were all safe from going to the Temple of Fate.
2 The Samahdi won by the Grey team in the endurance challenge allowed them to steal another team's pieces. The Grey team chose to steal the Yellow team's two pieces.
3 Due to Vanetta's removal from the game, Tom was eliminated at the Temple of Fate alone.
4 The final challenge, the Grey and Orange teams competed for the two pieces left behind by the Yellow team. The Grey team won both pieces.

Challenges
Ring of Fire
Bagging on You
Squaring Off
Out on a Limb
Bamboo Jungle
Pipeline
I'm Pulling for You
Balance Ball
Tri Try Again
You're Fired
Create Your Own Game
Color Coded
Battle for the Pieces
Final Temple

Season 4 - Endurance: Tehachapi (2005–06)
Returning to California for the next two seasons, Endurance: Tehachapi was taped in the Tehachapi Mountains at Tejon Ranch in the summer of 2005 for airing beginning that Fall. A 13th pyramid piece, Friendship, was added this season. The Red team of Franke Sisto and Erika Cook won the grand prize, a trip to Costa Rica.

Julie Dubela appeared on American Juniors in 2003 and auditioned for American Idol. Jeszie Geronimo appeared on TKO: Total Knock Out in 2018.

Contestants and teams
There was no Brown team this season, which meant only seven teams competed:

Elimination table

Key
 (FIRST) The team won the Final Temple Mission and became “Endurance” Champions.
 (SECOND) The team lost the Final Temple Mission and were the runners-up.
 (WIN) The team won the Endurance Mission, the previously eliminated team's pyramid pieces, and the Samadhi.
 (WIN) The team won the Temple Mission.
 (SAMADHI) The team was handicapped with the Samadhi by the winning team.
 (SAFE) The team did not win the challenge, but was safe from going to Temple or did not receive the Samadhi.
 (TEMPLE) The team won at the Temple of Fate and avoided elimination.
 (TEMPLE) The team came in last place during the Endurance mission and was forced to go to Temple in the next episode.
 (OUT) The team lost at the Temple of Fate and was eliminated.

Notes
1In "Drop Out," there was no Samadhi to give to another team. The winning team (Red) got the chance to create two super-teams. The Red team created their super-team of Red, Green, and Yellow. The second super-team was Blue, Purple, and Orange. The winning super-team members were all safe from going to the Temple of Fate.
2In "Waterworks," the Purple Team was forced to go to Temple of Fate in the next episode for coming last in the Endurance mission. If they won the next Temple Mission (the "Fireball" challenge), they could have sent another team in their place. However, they did not win it, so the Purple Team went to the Temple.
3In “Spin Fly,” each team won a certain amount of Pyramid Pieces in the challenge, which is indicated in parentheses.

Challenges
Blocked
Raft Pull
Drop Out
Super Stumped
Waterworks
Fireball  (a challenge from a previous season voted by "Endurance" fans to appear again)
Hang 5
Cubed
Create Your Own Game
Circle of Trust
Spin Fly
Final Temple

Season 5 - Endurance: High Sierras (2006–07)
The fifth season was taped at Shaver Lake in the High Sierra Mountains of central California. Contestants lived in multi-level tree houses without electricity. The Green Team of Alex Carignan and Cealey Godwin, won the grand prize, a trip to Hawaii.

In a new twist to the fifth season's contestant selection, the Discovery Kids website held a casting poll in which fans could vote for one boy and one girl out of six hopefuls. Garret Manno and Kelsey Schultz won this poll by a narrow margin and were the 99th and 100th contestants out of the history of the program.

In the third episode ("Unwind"), one team – Garret Manno and Anna Asare – was eliminated without going to Temple. They finished last in the first challenge and left the game without a team color; the other seven teams selected colors as they finished. The "colorless team" received the "Immunity Triangle", which they gave to the Purple team of Kelsey and Dakota. The team that received the Triangle of Immunity may use it once to avoid going to the Temple of Fate; they never did.

The Blue team of Connor Finnegan and Taylor Sico-McNulty set a record this season by surviving three trips to the Temple. Dakota Fisher, of the Purple team, was featured in a commercial for Burlington Coat Factory. Kelsey Schultz, also of the Purple team, appeared in the film Queen Sized. Max McFarland of the Orange team was featured on in-store advertisements nationwide in Hallmark Gold Crown stores. Aeriél Miranda of the Red team, competed in a family edition of Fear Factor, and had a recurring role as Shana on television drama Pretty Little Liars.

Contestants and teams
The eight teams competing were:

* Initially, the Blue team was Ike and Taylor and the Gray team was Connor and Darci. The Blue team gave the Samadhi to the Red team thinking they were going to switch Alex and Cameron but they used it to switch Connor and Ike.

** Anna and Garret were eliminated after an Endurance mission and never went to the Temple of Fate.

Elimination table

Key
 (FIRST) The team won the Final Temple Mission and became “Endurance” Champions.
 (SECOND) The team lost the Final Temple Mission and were the runners-up.
 (WIN) The team won the Endurance Mission, the previously eliminated team's pyramid pieces, and the Samadhi.
 (WIN) The team won the Temple Mission.
 (SAMADHI) The team was handicapped with the Samadhi by the winning team.
 (SAFE) The team did not win the challenge, but was safe from going to Temple or did not receive the Samadhi.
 (TEMPLE) The team won at the Temple of Fate and avoided elimination.
 (TEMPLE) The team came in last place during the Endurance mission and was forced to go to Temple in the next episode.
 (OUT) The team lost at the Temple of Fate and was eliminated.
 (OUT) The team was eliminated without a team color.

1 In “Unwind” Garret & Anna finished last in the challenge meaning they were eliminated without receiving a team color.
2 In “Hot Potato” the Blue Team of Ike and Taylor won the Samadhi that would allow the team who possessed it to switch two players on any two teams. After receiving the Samadhi, the Red Team used it to put Ike on the Gray team with Darci and Connor on the blue team with Taylor.
3 In “Fill & Spill”  there was no Samadhi to give to another team. The winning team (Purple) got the chance to create two super-teams. The Purple team created their super-team of Purple, Red, and Orange. The second super-team was Green, Blue, and Yellow. The winning super-team members were all safe from going to the Temple of Fate.
4 In “Create Your Own Game” the Red Team was forced to go to Temple of Fate in the next episode for coming last in the Endurance mission. If they won the next Temple Mission (the "Fill ‘Er Up" challenge), they could have sent another team in their place. However, they did not win it, so the Red Team went to Temple.
5 In “Slingshot Alley”  the Green and Purple teams competed for the final eight pyramid pieces of the game. The Green team won five while the Purple team won three of the pieces.

Challenges
Unwind
Hot Potato
Move It Along
Walk The Plank
Fill & Spill
Superboats
It's A Drag
C.Y.O.G.
Fill ‘Er Up
All Tied Up
Slingshot Alley
Final Temple

Season 6 – Endurance: Fiji (2007–08)
Repeating the candidate selection innovation first introduced for Season 5's Endurance: High Sierras, a casting poll was again held at the Discovery Kids website, allowing fans to select two contestants from a group of six hopefuls. The contest ran from June until July 9. Will Cuddy and Leslie Powell won the casting poll (and later became the Green Team). Two contestants are siblings of previous Endurance contestants. Connor Konz's sister Abbey and Leslie Powell's brother Glen both competed in Season 2 (and were subsequently eliminated in the Right-to Stay challenge).

Episodes began airing on October 13, 2007, on the Discovery Kids channel with the finale broadcast March 8, 2008. A new feature, the "Magic Box", was introduced in this season's third episode (Mana Kisi), giving a secret advantage to the team that wins it.

The Blue team of Ben Scheuer and Jordyn Barbato won the grand prize which was a trip to Australia. This was also the second time the blue team has become the endurance champion with Jonna Mannion and Aaron Throrburg being the first in season 1.

Also, with this being the last season, that leaves the Purple, Orange and Yellow teams without winning an Endurance.

Briana Vega (who was on the Yellow Team) was a contestant on High School Musical: Get in the Picture.

Rebecca Simonoko (who was eliminated in the right-to-stay challenge) is currently featured on a web series entitled "Life on Tour", a teen travel experience from the makers of The Real World.

Jonathan Young competed on Survivor 42, which also filmed in Fiji.

There was no Gray or Brown team this season, which meant only six teams competed:

Elimination table

Key
 (FIRST) The team won the Final Temple Mission and became “Endurance” Champions.
 (SECOND) The team lost the Final Temple Mission and were the runners-up.
 (WIN) The team won the Endurance Mission, the previously eliminated team's pyramid pieces, and the Samadhi.
 (WIN) The team won the Temple Mission.
 (SAMADHI) The team was handicapped with the Samadhi by the winning team.
 (SAFE) The team did not win the challenge, but was safe from going to Temple or did not receive the Samadhi.
 (TEMPLE) The team won at the Temple of Fate and avoided elimination.
 (TEMPLE) The team was selected to go to Temple by the Endurance mission winners.
 (OUT) The team lost at the Temple of Fate and was eliminated.

1 By winning the first challenge, the Green team won the Magic Box.
2 The Orange team decided to remove the Samadhi from the game so that they could instead automatically send the Yellow team to the Temple of Fate.
3 In “Shark Bait” the Blue and Red Teams won the challenge, and each had the right to send one team to the Temple, even the other winning team.
4 In “Stand Bags” the Red Team won the challenge but was not guaranteed immunity.
5 In the "Scavenger Hunt" challenge, the Blue and Green teams competed for the final five pyramid pieces of the game. The Blue team won two while the Green team won three of the pieces.

Challenges
Sand Bar Relay
Blind Faith
Box Launch
Fish Food
Weight An Hour
Island Hopping
3 To Go/Shark Bait
Stand Bags
Scavenger Hunt
Final Temple

References

Notes

External links
 Internet Movie Database pages:
 Endurance
 Endurance 2
 Endurance 3: Hawaii
 Endurance 4: Tehachapi
 Endurance 5: High Sierras
 Endurance 6: Fiji

2000s American game shows
2000s American reality television series
2000s American teen television series
2002 American television series debuts
2008 American television series endings
American adventure television series
American educational television series
English-language television shows
Discovery Kids original programming
Television series about teenagers
Television shows filmed in California
Television shows filmed in Mexico
Television shows filmed in Hawaii
Television shows filmed in Ecuador
Television shows filmed in Fiji